Mohammed Farooq (10 January 1949- 20 August 2018) was a Bangladeshi Ambassador who had served as the Chief Information Commissioner leading the Information Commission. He is the former Ambassador of Bangladesh to the Philippines.

Early life 
Farooq was born on 10 January 1949 in Bhola, East Bengal, Pakistan.

Career 
Farooq joined Bangladesh Civil Service in 1973 as a cadre of the Foreign Affairs branch. He had worked at the Bangladesh High Commission in Australia, Bhutan, and Malaysia. He was also stationed in the Bangladeshi consulate in Los Angeles and the Bangladesh Embassy in the United States.

From December 2000 to February 2002, Farooq was the Ambassador of Bangladesh to the Philippines.

On 16 October 2012, Farooq was appointed Chief Information Commissioner replacing Ambassador Muhammed Zamir. Farooq hosted Ronald Meinardus, Regional Director of Friedrich Naumann Foundation, in February 2015 in Dhaka. He met with delegates from Management and Resource Development Initiative who had suggestions for improving the Right to Information Act. He called for political commitment to ending corruption in Bangladesh.

On 9 January 2016, Farooq left the Information Commission and was replaced by Professor Md. Golam Rahman.

Death 
Farooq died on 20 August 2018 in Dhaka, Bangladesh.

References 

1949 births
2018 deaths
People from Bhola District
Bangladeshi civil servants
Ambassadors of Bangladesh to the Philippines
Bangladeshi diplomats
Chief Information Commissioners of Bangladesh